Gary Conway (born February 4, 1936) is an American actor and screenwriter. His notable credits include a co-starring role with Gene Barry in the detective series Burke's Law from 1963 to 1965.  In addition, he starred in the Irwin Allen sci-fi series Land of the Giants from 1968 to 1970.

Life
Conway was born in Boston, Massachusetts. 

He has been married for many years to Marian McKnight, who was Miss America, 1957. They first met while students at the University of California, Los Angeles, where Conway studied art. The couple have two children, Gareth and Kathleen.
 

Conway and McKnight have worked together in film production and writing. They owned a winery called Carmody McKnight that they started in 1985. They sold it to the Wonderful Company (Justin Vineyards & Winery) in 2019. 

Conway and his Burke's Law co-star Gene Barry remained close friends until Barry's death in late 2009.

Career 
Conway's early film credits include the cult horror films I Was a Teenage Frankenstein (1957) as the monster, How to Make a Monster (1958), and The Saga of the Viking Women and Their Voyage to the Waters of the Great Sea Serpent (1958). In 1958, he was cast in the Man Hunt episode of the western aviation television series Sky King with Kirby Grant, Richard Beymer, and Gloria Winters.

In 1960 Conway appeared as Orderly on the TV western Maverick in the episode titled Thunder from the North.  In 1960, Conway appeared as Lt. Charles Williams in the episode Absent Without Leave of the ABC/Warner Brothers western series  Colt .45, starring Wayde Preston; in the guest cast were Tyler McVey as Col. Ben Williams and Steve Brodie. In 1960 Conway also appeared  in three episodes (as three different characters of the ABC/WB crime drama Bourbon Street Beat, starring Andrew Duggan. 

In 1966 Conway made an unsuccessful television pilot Assault!, made by the producers of Combat! about the US Marine Corps in the Pacific in 1942. From 1968 to 1970 Gary starred in the TV series Land of the Giants  as Captain Steve Burton.

Conway starred with Bette Davis in the 1972 television movie The Judge and Jake Wyler.  He also guest-starred as the murder victim in the 1973 Columbo episode "Any Old Port in a Storm".

In 1973, Conway was featured in Playgirl magazine's August issue.

His other film credits include Young Guns of Texas (1962), Black Gunn (1972), The Farmer (1977), Once Is Not Enough (1975), American Ninja 2: The Confrontation (1987), and Liberty & Bash (1989). Conway also starred in Woman's Story (2000), which he also wrote and directed. 

In 1987, Conway had teamed up with Dean Zanetos to form a new production-distribution company, Ambush Entertainment Corporation, which started with a three-feature program, in order to contemplate [sic] video and TV projects as well.

References

External links 
 
 

1936 births
Living people
American male film actors
American male television actors
Male actors from Boston
UCLA School of the Arts and Architecture alumni
Wine merchants
Playgirl Men of the Month